The Japanese city of Fukuoka was attacked by United States Army Air Forces Boeing B-29 Superfortress heavy bombers on 19 June 1945. This operation formed part of the Allied Air raids on Japan, and destroyed 21.5 percent of the city. B-29s also dropped naval mines near Fukuoka harbor on seven occasions between May and July 1945, and the city was attacked twice by American fighter aircraft.

19 June 1945 raid

The single bombing raid on Fukuoka formed part of a campaign by the USAAF's XXI Bomber Command targeting medium-sized Japanese cities which began in mid-June 1945 and continued until the end of the war. These attacks used firebombing tactics to destroy the cities, and were conducted as a follow-on from raids which had devastated most of Japan's major cities. Fukuoka, with a population of 323,200, was the largest city targeted in this campaign. Most of these raids were conducted by a single wing of B-29s, which allowed XXI Bomber Command to attack four cities a night. However, Fukuoka and Ōmuta (on 26 July) were targeted by two wings due to their size.

The 73rd and 313rd Bombardment Wings were assigned to attack Fukuoka. These units dispatched a total of 239 B-29s. Of these, 223 bombed the primary target. Another four bombed targets of opportunity in Tomitaka, Chichijima, Miyazaki and Fukuoka. All of the B-29s returned to base.

On 20 June, four American B-29 airmen who were being held as prisoners of war at Fukuoka were murdered by Japanese soldiers. These killings were motivated by the casualties and damage caused by the raid and a belief among the personnel involved that Japan would soon be invaded. Another 29 captured American airmen were murdered at Fukuoka in August 1945.

Minelaying

Fukuoka harbor was targeted as part of a large-scale aerial minelaying campaign. The first minelaying operation targeting the harbor took place on 25 May 1945. 15 B-29s from the 9th Bombardment Group were dispatched, of which 14 laid mines. All of the bombers returned to base. The 9th Bombardment Group dropped further mines off Fukuoka harbor on 27 May.

Fukuoka harbor was targeted again in June. On 7 June, ten B-29s of the 505th Bombardment Group were dispatched, and six laid mines. Eight 505th Bombardment Group aircraft dropped further mines off the city on 15 June. The 505th Bombardment Group struck again on 23 June, with nine B-29s laying mines. One of these aircraft was lost during the operation.

Further operations were conducted in July. On 13 July, three B-29s of the 6th Bombardment Group were dispatched to lay mines near Fukuoka harbor. Historian Robert Mann has written that it is not known how many of these aircraft dropped mines. Another minelaying operation was conducted by six B-29s from the 504th Bombardment Group on 29 July, but Mann also notes that the number which actually dropped mines is not known.

Other operations

Fukuoka was attacked twice by USAAF fighter aircraft. On 23 June, Republic P-47 Thunderbolt fighters from the Seventh Air Force attacked an airfield at Hakata in Fukuoka. North American P-51 Mustang fighters of the Fifth Air Force attacked Fukuoka harbor on 3 July. The fighters destroyed several floatplanes.

On 17 July a B-29 from the 39th Bombardment Group conducted a radar reconnaissance mission against Fukuoka.

Results

The 19 June raid destroyed  of Fukuoka's urban area, representing 21.5 percent of the city. Wartime Japanese reports stated that 953 people were killed in all the attacks on Fukuoka.

See also
 Strategic bombing during World War II
 Evacuations of civilians in Japan during World War II

References

Citations

Works consulted
 
 

 

Fukuoka
Fukuoka
Fukuoka
June 1945 events in Asia
Fukuoka
1945 in Japan
Fukuoka
Events in Fukuoka